Liberty Township, Arkansas may refer to:

 Liberty Township, Carroll County, Arkansas
 Liberty Township, Dallas County, Arkansas
 Liberty Township, Independence County, Arkansas
 Liberty Township, Lee County, Arkansas
 Liberty Township, Marion County, Arkansas
 Liberty Township, Ouachita County, Arkansas
 Liberty Township, Pope County, Arkansas
 Liberty Township, Saline County, Arkansas
 Liberty Township, Stone County, Arkansas
 Liberty Township, Van Buren County, Arkansas
 Liberty Township, White County, Arkansas

See also 
 List of townships in Arkansas
 Liberty Township (disambiguation)

Arkansas township disambiguation pages